Dasycladus is a genus of green algae in the family Dasycladaceae. Dasycladus is a marine species.

References

External links

Ulvophyceae genera
Dasycladaceae